is a Japanese professional shogi player ranked 6-dan.

Promotion history
The promotion history for Makino is as follows:

 6-kyū: September 22, 1999
 4-dan: April 1, 2010
 5-dan: February 25, 2015
 6-dan: February 10, 2021

References

External links
ShogiHub: Professional Player Info · Makino, Mitsunori

Japanese shogi players
Living people
Professional shogi players
Professional shogi players from Wakayama Prefecture
1988 births
People from Wakayama (city)